Mokhonoana is a common surname of the Northern Ndebele people in South Africa.

The surname is most common in Mokopane, but has also spread to other parts of South Africa, such as the townships of Pretoria and Johannesburg. The Mokhonoana descendants originate from the Kekana people. As a result of conflict with members of a Tsonga tribe, some Kekana were left with hands cut short (called Mokhonoana - meaning "Those with short hands").  The Mokhonoana rank highest out of the descendants of the Royal Family of Kekana. Today, tribes like the Lamola, the Lekalakala, the Kutumela, and the Monama exist as descendants of the Mokhonoana.

References

Surnames